Doris Taylor (born ca. 1960), American stem cell scientist.

Doris Taylor may also refer to:

Doris Irene Taylor (1909–1968), founder and organiser of Meals on Wheels in South Australia
Doris Taylor (plant)

See also
Doris Tayler, commonly known as Doris Lessing, writer